The 1926 FBUs Pokalturnering (Unofficial English translation: 1926 FBU Cup, 1926 Funen Cup) was the 7th edition of the regional tournament, FBUs Pokalturnering, the highest senior cup competition organised by the Funen FA (FBU). The tournament was held in the third quarter of 1926 with B 1913 as the defending cup champions. The season was launched on 8 August 1926 with the preliminary round involving two matches involving Ejby BK versus Dalum BK and Assens G&IK versus AIK Bogense, while Bogense G&IF and Arbejdernes I&BK (AIB) of Middelfart both received a bye to the next round. A total of eighteen teams from the 1925–26 FBUs A-række, the 1925–26 FBUs B-række and three new member clubs of the regional football association participated in the cup tournament, which embraced seventeen cup matches — the reigning Funen champions Svendborg BK from the top-flight league choose not to participate in this year's edition.

This season's installment was won by B 1913 after defeating Odense BK 3–1 in the final played at OB's field at Munke Mose in Odense on 5 September 1926, which was the club's second cup title in a row in the same number of finals. Odense-based B 1913 secured its berth in the final by defeating the Funen FA's newest member, Særslev BK, including league rivals B 1909 and BK Marienlyst, eventually making the tournament's final a repeat of the 1925 FBUs Pokalturnering final. They outscored their opponents 28–2 on aggregate in the four games played in this year's competition. The cup tournament took place before the start of the 1926–27 regional league season tournaments.

Participants

The following 18 teams participated in the cup tournament.

Matches

Bracket

Preliminary round
Four FBUs B-række clubs entered the competition at this stage. The matches were scheduled for Sunday, 8 August 1926. Two teams gained a bye due to a lower amount of entries to the competition than originally expected.

First round proper
The matches were scheduled for Sunday, 15 August 1926. Arbejdernes I&BK filed a protest to the Funen FA proclaiming that the match referee unjustifiably sent off an AIB player.

Quarter-finals
The four quarter-final ties were scheduled to be played on Sunday, 22 August 1926.

Semi-finals
Both semi-final matches were played in Odense on Sunday, 29 August 1926 with no replays required. B 1913 and Odense BK came through the semi final round to meet at OB's Bane i Munke Mose, Odense.

Cup Final

Match summary
The 1926 FBUs Pokalturnering final was contested by B 1913 and Odense BK at OB's Bane i Munke Mose, Odense on Sunday, 5 September 1926, which was a repeat of the 1925 FBUs Pokalturnering final. The game was refereed by Sophus Hansen (affiliated with BK Frem). Based on the team's merits in the cup tournament and their recent league standings, the defending cup champions and league runners-up B 1913 were regarded as favorites to win the cup title against Odense BK by various newspapers. The Odense BK squad was mostly composed of new players, including a new goalkeeper, and this final was regarded as their first most important match so far. William von Würden had trained the Odense BK squad the past summer. The draw concerning the right to choose the starting half of the football field was won by B 1913, who choose to have the strong wind in their backs.

Despite battling with a headwind, Odense BK had a predominance of goal scoring chances and game play in the first half. The first goal was netted in the 20th minute by Odense BK right innerwing Børge Jensen after a pass from the left side outside the reach of B 1913's goalkeeper Olaf "Laffe" Petersen, while the equalizing goal by B 1913's Henry "Lodvig" Ludvigsen was scored fifteen minutes later following a pass from Martin "Malle" Petersen, and the first half ending in an 1–1 tie. The game play was more even during the second half. In the 75th minute, B 1913's forward Albert Fischer passed the ball to Ludvigsen, who scored his second goal, which the newspaper Fyens Stiftstidende and Fyns Social-Demokrat reported should have been ruled as offside. It started to rain right after the goal was scored. The lead energized the B 1913 players and following some fumble play in front of the goal, Ludvigsen was credited with scoring B 1913's third goal four minutes before full time, completing a hat-trick.

The match ended with the score 3–1 to B 1913 in front of an attendance of 550 spectators, securing the Odense-based club their second consecutive cup title in two final entries.

Match details

Footnotes

Statistics

Hat-tricks

 5 Player scored 5 goals

References

FBUs Pokalturnering
1926–27 in Danish football
Denmark